is a Japanese footballer currently playing as a goalkeeper for Vegalta Sendai.

Career statistics

Club
.

Notes

Honours
 Tokushima Vortis
 J2 League (1): 2020

References

External links

1992 births
Living people
Sportspeople from Yokohama
Association football people from Kanagawa Prefecture
Waseda University alumni
Japanese footballers
Japan youth international footballers
Association football goalkeepers
Tokyo Verdy players
JEF United Chiba players
Vissel Kobe players
Tokushima Vortis players